Calliotropis valida is a species of sea snail, a marine gastropod mollusk in the family Eucyclidae.

Description
The height of the shell attains 16 mm.

Distribution
This species occurs in the Atlantic Ocean off the Cape Verdes.

References

  Dautzenberg, Ph.; Fischer, H. (1906). Mollusques provenant des dragages effectués à l'ouest de l'Afrique pendant les campagnes scientifiques de S.A.S. le Prince de Monaco. Résultats des Campagnes Scientifiques Accomplies sur son Yacht par Albert Ier Prince Souverain de Monaco, XXXII. Imprimerie de Monaco: Monaco. 125 p., 5 plates
 Rolán E., 2005. Malacological Fauna From The Cape Verde Archipelago. Part 1, Polyplacophora and Gastropoda.

External links
 To World Register of Marine Species

valida
Gastropods described in 1906
Gastropods of Cape Verde